Huopalahti was a municipality during the years 1920–1945 in Uusimaa, Finland. The municipality was bilingual.

Current areas of Munkkiniemi, Lauttasaari and parts of northern Pasila were parts of Huopalahti.
The area was separated from former Helsinki parish in 1920. Haaga was part of the municipality, but was separated from it in 1923. The Finnish National Defence University, that was moved to Munkkiniemi in 1923, was located in Huopalahti. In 1946, the municipality was consolidated to Helsinki.

The Finnish Hunting Society which is headquartered in the city hosted the shotgun shooting events for the 1952 Summer Olympics.

See also
Huopalahti railway station

References
1952 Summer Olympics official report. p. 57.

Venues of the 1952 Summer Olympics
Olympic shooting venues
Populated places disestablished in 1946